Peter John Cain (born 10 November 1954) is an Australian politician, elected to the seat of Ginninderra in Australian Capital Territory Legislative Assembly on 17 October 2020, representing the Canberra Liberals.

Early life and education 
Cain was born in Kurri Kurri, New South Wales, and attended local primary and secondary schools. He graduated from the University of Newcastle with a bachelor's degree in Mathematics (Hons), and a Diploma of Education.

Cain's early career was in teaching in NSW, South Australia and the ACT. He returned to study at the University of Canberra obtaining a Bachelor of Laws (Hons), followed by a Graduate Diploma of Legal Practice at the Australian National University.

Following graduation, Cain worked in the ACT Government in the Revenue Management Branch of Treasury, where his most senior role was managing the tax disputes section, Objection and Appeals.

He served as Vice President of the ACT Law Society from September 2017 to September 2020.

Political career 
Cain was pre-selected for the Canberra Liberals' ticket for Ginninderra in December 2019. In October 2020, Cain was elected as a Member of the Legislative Assembly. Cain was appointed the following shadow portfolios; Attorney-General, Planning and Land Management, Multicultural Affairs and Assistant Treasurer. Cain's former portfolios were Regulatory Services and Jobs and Workplace Affairs, that were redistributed to other Liberal MLAs in the mid-2022 reshuffle. Cain is also an Assistant Speaker of the Legislative Assembly.

Personal life 
Cain is married to Claire with seven children, and lives in Belconnen. He is a practising Christian and a vegan.

References 

Living people
Members of the Australian Capital Territory Legislative Assembly
21st-century Australian politicians
Liberal Party of Australia members of the Australian Capital Territory Legislative Assembly
1954 births